Dan Sealey is the former session bass guitarist for the rock group Ocean Colour Scene.  He was drafted in by the band after Damon Minchella left the band in 2003.  Sealey is also in Merrymouth, a folk band with Ocean Colour Scene bandmate Simon Fowler and Adam Barry. Before joining Ocean Colour Scene Sealey was a member of the  band Late.

Late
Prior to joining Ocean Colour Scene, Sealey was singer and rhythm guitarist in Late, a four-piece indie/rock band from Astwood Bank, Redditch, Worcestershire who were active between 1997 and 2001. The band members were:
 Dan Sealey - vocals and rhythm guitar
 Paul McCormack - lead guitar
 Greg Young - bass guitar
 Ted Atkinson - drums
In 2001, Late supported Ocean Colour Scene at a number of UK gigs in a slot which had previously been filled by Coldplay. Late were managed by Dan's father Dave Sealey, who was one half of folk/music hall duo Cosmotheka along with his brother Al Sealey. They were funded by digital start up company, Resurrection Sound Ltd - which later went on to form publishing company, Dan Sealey Music LLP.
Late recorded one album, titled "All Major Routes". It is not known whether this was ever commercially released. Demo copies do exist though, with the following tracks included

Still Go On
Easy
Driver
See My Room
The Day Will Come
Women On Top
We Could Be Wasted
Sleep
Man In The Middle
Take Me Home

"Man In The Middle" was re-recorded by Ocean Colour Scene for inclusion on the On the Leyline album. Also, footage exists of Late performing "Still Go On" on an unknown television show.

Ocean Colour Scene

Sealey became involved with Birmingham band Ocean Colour Scene after the departure of original bass player and founder member Damon Minchella in late 2003. Sealey already had a loose connection to Ocean Colour Scene because his sister Claire is married to Matthew Fowler, the brother of Simon Fowler. Sealey 'sent a speculative text message to Simon saying if they were short he'd step up' and 'then in 4 January Dan gets a call from Simon asking if he could fill in on the bass for a gig at the Albert Hall for a Ronnie Lane tribute gig. Dan said "YES", nailed the gig and has been playing bass for OCS ever since.'

He was not asked to contribute to the last OCS album, Painting or to join them on future tours.

Merrymouth
2012 saw Sealey and Ocean Colour Scene bandmate Fowler team up with multi-instrumentalist Mike McNamara to release a record, eventually called Simon Fowlers Merrymouth featuring guest appearances from John McCusker and Andy Cutting.

2014, now called "Merrymouth", Sealey, Fowler and Adam Barry, founder member of The Misers, return with their second album, Wenlock Hill, featuring once again McCusker and a special appearance from Chas Hodges of Chas and Dave.

Sealey has written songs for both Merrymouth albums, including Last Train But One, In The Midst Of Summertime, Mr Marshall, Blink Of An Eye and That Man.

Since Merrymouth's second album, the band was put on hiatus as Fowler went back to concentrating on OCS. Sealey then slightly amended the name to Merrymaker and continues to play their songs as a solo artist. He has also continued to write and record under that name.

He also has a covers band called The Rock Bottoms (with Adam Barry).

Solo work
In addition to his work with Ocean Colour Scene, Sealey has been writing and recording solo material for release in the near future, some of these songs can be heard on Sealey's Myspace page.
Solo songs known to exist include:
 "Mr Marshall"
 "Hello Hello"
 "Monkey"
 "Monkey Reprise"
 "I wanna go home"
 "In the mids't of summer time"
 "Long way to go"

Cricket
Dan Sealey is a batsman and bowler for the Astwood Bank Village Cricket Club.

References

External links
 Dan Sealey Official Website
 Official Dan Sealey Myspace

Living people
British rock bass guitarists
Musicians from Worcestershire
People from Redditch
1970 births
21st-century English bass guitarists